DLNR may refer to:

 Hawaii Department of Land and Natural Resources
 Donetsk People's Republic and Luhansk People's Republic, collectively, two occupied territories of Ukraine